Riotord is a commune in the Haute-Loire department in south-central France.

Population

Sights
Arboretum de l'Hermet
SolArtParc

See also
Communes of the Haute-Loire department

References

Communes of Haute-Loire
Forez